The Härnösand Coastal Artillery Regiment, designation KA 5, was a Swedish Navy coastal artillery regiment of the Swedish Armed Forces which operated between 1943 and 1998. The unit was based in Härnösand.

History
In 1914, construction began on Hemsö Fortress. After World War I ended in 1918, the coastal artillery corps that was planned was never raised, and the newly built barracks in Härnösand was instead handed over to the health service. For a period of years, however, operations at Hemsö Fortress were strengthened by various other coastal artillery detachments. Among other things, the 12 cm batteries were manned in the mid-1930s by the 1st Company and the 6th Company from Vaxholm Coastal Artillery Regiment (KA 1). At the outbreak of World War II in 1939, 125 conscripts were transferred from Vaxholm Coastal Artillery Regiment. Two years later, another 400 conscripts and about 10 officers from Karlskrona Coastal Artillery Regiment (KA 2) were stationed on Hemsön. The Defence Act of 1942 stated that the detachment in Hemsö Fortress would replace the detached division from KA 1 and on 1 October 1943 the Defence Act would be enforced. This formed the Härnösand Coastal Artillery Detachment (KA 4 H). The designation KA 4 H did not indicate a military command relationship between the two troop units Älvsborg Coastal Artillery Regiment (KA 4) and Härnösand Coastal Artillery Detachment (KA 4 H), but only indicated that KA 4 would provide some support to the finance, machinery and craft departments.

The last round of training ended in the autumn of 1997, with the entire 6th Amphibious Battalion then fully trained. The disbandment ceremony for HMG/KA 5 was held on 14 August 1998. The ceremony began with the last acting commander of HMG/KA 5, Major Gunnar Hällgren, handing over the regimental colour to the commander of the Norrland Coast Naval Command, Senior Captain Olov Andersson. The management of the traditions of the Härnösand Marine Group (Härnösands maringrupp) with Härnösand Coastal Artillery Regiment was thus passed to the Norrland Coast Naval Command (MKN). The only military presence left on Härnön is located to the chancellery and the northern part of the barracks area.

Location and training areas
When Härnösand Coastal Artillery Regiment was formed, the unit was located to Kusthöjden in northeastern Härnösand. The construction of the establishment at Kusthöjden started in 1944 after the drawings of the 1940 Military Building Investigation. On 19 June 1945, the double swallow-tailed Swedish flag was hoisted for the first time at the top of the new chancellery in Härnösand. In total, about 30 buildings were built in the area. At the end of the 1960s, an annex was built to the chancellery, after Norrland Coastal Artillery Defence with Härnösand Coastal Artillery Corps was amalgamated into a joint administrative unit. Furthermore, new buildings were also built at the garage area. After Norrland Coastal Artillery Defence was disbanded, the area was managed by the Norrland Coast Naval Command. In 2000, most of the area was sold to Vasallen, but most of the buildings still house military units and staffs.

Heraldry and traditions

Coat of arms
The coat of arms of the Härnösand Coastal Artillery Regiment (KA 5) was used by KA 5 from 1975 to 1994, by the Norrland kustartilleriförsvar med Härnösands kustartilleriregemente (NK/KA 5) from 1975 to 1994, by the Härnösands maringrupp med Härnösands kustartilleriregemente (HMG) from 1994 to 1997 and by the Härnösandsgruppen since 1997. Blazon: "Argent, the town badge of Härnösand, a beaver, a pike in the mouth, both sable. The shield surmounted two gunbarrels of older pattern in saltire above a flaming grenade and waves".

Colours, standards and guidons
The colour of the regiment was presented to the regiment on 1 June 1945 by His Majesty the King Gustaf V at a ceremony at Stockholm Palace. It was used as regimental colour by KA 5 until 1 January 1998. The colour is drawn by Brita Grep and embroidered by hand in insertion technique probably by the company Libraria. Blazon: "On red cloth in the centre the badge of the former Coastal Artillery; two gunbarrels of older pattern in saltire under a royal crown proper and over a blazing grenade and waves, all yellow. In the first corner the town badge of Härnösand; a beaver with a pike in its mouth, all white."

Medals
In 1999, the Härnösands kustartilleriregementes (KA 5) minnesmedalj ("Härnösand Coastal Artillery Regiment (KA 5) Commemorative Medal") in silver (HärnkaregSMM) of the 8th size was established. The medal ribbon is of red moiré with a broad yellow stripe on each side.

Commanding officers
Corps and regimental commanders active in Härnösand Coastal Artillery Regiment. From 1961, the unit commander was also head of the Norrland Coast Coastal Artillery Defence and from 1986 of the Norrland Coast Naval Command.

1942–1950: Ragnar Isaacsson 
1950–1957: Swen Lagerberg
1957–1964: Stig Stade
1964–1966: Gunnar Eklund
1966–1974: Jan Beckman
1974–1977: Eric Jarneberg
1977–1981: Per-Erik Bergstrand
1981–1983: Lars Ahlström
1983–1985: Lars G. Persson
1985–1991: Karl-Wilhelm Hansen
1991–1994: Ulf Rubarth
1994–1996: Claes-Göran Hedén
1996–1998: Olov Andersson

Names, designations and locations

See also
List of Swedish coastal artillery regiments

Footnotes

References

Notes

Print

Further reading

Regiments of the Swedish Navy
Military units and formations established in 1942
Military units and formations disestablished in 1998
Disbanded units and formations of Sweden
1942 establishments in Sweden
1998 disestablishments in Sweden